Laura Teani (born 13 March 1991) is an Italian water polo player of Italy.

She was part of the Italian team winning the bronze medal at the 2015 World Aquatics Championships, where she played as goalkeeper. She participated in the 2016 Summer Olympics.

See also
 Italy women's Olympic water polo team records and statistics
 List of Olympic medalists in water polo (women)
 List of women's Olympic water polo tournament goalkeepers
 List of World Aquatics Championships medalists in water polo

References

External links
 

1991 births
Living people
Sportspeople from Bergamo
Italian female water polo players
Water polo goalkeepers
Water polo players at the 2016 Summer Olympics
Medalists at the 2016 Summer Olympics
Olympic silver medalists for Italy in water polo
World Aquatics Championships medalists in water polo
Universiade medalists in water polo
Universiade bronze medalists for Italy
Medalists at the 2013 Summer Universiade
21st-century Italian women